Oncidium cornigerum is a species of orchid found from southern and southeastern Brazil to Paraguay.

References

External links 

cornigerum
Flora of Paraguay
Orchids of Brazil